Aadhaar  is a 2019 Indian Hindi-language dramedy film directed by Suman Ghosh. The film is written by Amitosh Nagpal and Suman Ghosh. Amitosh has also written dialogues and lyrics for the film. Produced by Manish Mundra under his banner Drishyam Films, the film stars Vineet Kumar Singh, who is the first one in his village to get his Aadhaar card made. Raghubir Yadav, Saurabh Shukla and Sanjay Mishra appear in supporting roles. The film had its premiere at the 24th Busan International Film Festival under the section 'A Window on Asian Cinema'. It was supposed to be released in India this 5 February 2021, but it was postponed.<ref>{{cite news|url=https://www.outlookindia.com/newsscroll/amp/vineet-kumar-singhs-aadhaar-to-release-on-feb-5-in-theatres/2009117|title=Vineet ] Kumar Singhs Aadhaar to release on Feb 5 in theatres|work=Outlook|date= 12 January 2021|accessdate=12 January 2021}}</ref>

Synopsis
The film revolves around Pharsua, resident of village of Jamua, and his aadhaar (resident identification) card ID, issued by the Indian government. Villagers are suspicious that the government will collect their information and monitor them, so they show no interest in the new ID card despite the benefits that accrue to ID cardholders. Pharsua volunteers and he becomes the first person in the village to receive the new aadhaar card and is a star. But one day, the village priest predicts that the serial number on his ID card will soon cause the death of his wife, and Pharsua starts on a journey to save his wife. Now getting his ID number changed is of utmost importance to him, but it becomes an inviolable and unchangeable absolute number since it has been entered into the system. Pharsua wails about the unfairness of his ID number, but no one outside of his village listens to his pleas.

Cast
Vineet Kumar Singh as Pharsua
Sanjay Mishra as Shastri
Saurabh Shukla as Parmanand Singh
Raghubir Yadav as Ghisu
Alka Amin as Rani's Mother
Ekavali Khanna as Mrs.Dahiya
Vishwanath Chatterjee as Minister
Prithvi Hatte as Rani
Prem Prakash Modi as Rani's Father
Ishtiyak Khan as Rastogi
Bachan Pachera as Santram

Production
Ghosh, a director who has made films in Bengali cinema, said that he had several stories that will have "no takers in Bangla cinema." In 2011, he read an article about the Aadhaar Card on The New York Times, which triggered the idea of the film and he wrote a synopsis. Ghosh sent the synopsis of Aadhaar'' to the co-production market of the Busan International Film Festival which was eventually selected in 2016. The film was shot in Jharkhand in December 2018 to January. The shooting wrapped in February 2019.

References

External links
 

2010s Hindi-language films
2019 films
Indian comedy-drama films
2019 comedy-drama films
Films shot in Jharkhand
Films set in Jharkhand
Films directed by Suman Ghosh